= ComicBlitz =

Digital comics distribution platform

ComicBlitz was an unlimited, streaming, digital comics' distribution platform. Its initial application launched October 6, 2015, for iOS later expanding to include a mobile-responsive, web-based app for Android (operating system) and Windows Mobile users on smartphones, tablet computers, and personal computers.
